Francis Patrick "Chink" Crossin Jr. (July 4, 1923 – January 10, 1981) was an American professional basketball player. He earned his nickname from the sound that the chain-link nets made when his shots dropped through.

During his high school basketball career at Luzerne High School in Luzerne, Pennsylvania, Crossin averaged 24 points per game, and led all Pennsylvania high school players in scoring in 1941. He played basketball at the University of Pennsylvania in the 1942–43 and 1943–44 seasons before serving in World War II with the United States Navy for two years. Crossin returned to Penn for the 1946–47 season. After the end of his college career, Crossin was selected with the 6th pick in the inaugural 1947 BAA draft by the Philadelphia Warriors. In three seasons with the team, Crossin averaged 4.7 points and 1.5 assists per game. Crossin played five seasons in the Eastern Professional Basketball League (EPBL) from 1950 to 1955 for the Pottsville Pros/Packers, Wilkes-Barre Aces, Williamsport Billies, Berwick Carbuilders, Hazleton Pros and Sunbury Mercuries. He was named the EPBL Most Valuable Player in 1952 and was a two-time All-EPBL First Team selection.

BAA/NBA career statistics

Regular season

Playoffs

References

External links

1923 births
1981 deaths
All-American college men's basketball players
American Basketball League (1925–1955) players
American men's basketball players
Basketball players from Pennsylvania
Guards (basketball)
Penn Quakers men's basketball players
Philadelphia Warriors draft picks
Philadelphia Warriors players
United States Navy personnel of World War II